The De Vere Society is a registered educational charity (Charity no. 297855) dedicated to the proposition that Edward de Vere, 17th Earl of Oxford was the author of the works of William Shakespeare. The society accepts there are many alternative views to this proposition and welcomes open debate. It was first registered as a society of Oxford University in 1987.

History
The society was founded by Charles Beauclerk, who is a descendant of De Vere. It is dedicated to the belief that the works of Shakespeare were written by Edward de Vere.

Publications
The society publishes a quarterly newsletter for members. Two books and a 2-CD radio play have been published by the society:

 Kevin Gilvary, Dating Shakespeare's Plays: A Critical Review of the Evidence (2010; Parapress). 
 Richard Malim, Great Oxford: Essays on the Life and Work of Edward de Vere 17th Earl of Oxford, 1550-1604 (2004; Parapress). 
 Alexander Waugh, Shakespeare in Court: A radio play (2013; De Vere Society).

See also
 Oxfordian theory of Shakespeare authorship
 Shakespeare authorship question
 Shakespeare Oxford Fellowship
 Declaration of Reasonable Doubt

References

External links

Oxfordian theory of Shakespeare authorship
Shakespeare authorship organizations
Organizations established in 1987
1987 establishments in the United Kingdom
Clubs and societies in the United Kingdom